Maavichiguru is a 1996 Indian Telugu-language drama film written and directed by S. V. Krishna Reddy. The film is produced by P. Usharani under Chandra Kiran Films and presented by Sri Sravanthi Movies. It stars Jagapathi Babu, Aamani, and Ranjitha with music composed by S. V. Krishna Reddy. The film was remade in Malayalam as Kumkumacheppu (1996), in Kannada as Mangalasutra (1997) and in Tamil as Thodarum (1999). The film won three Nandi Awards.

Plot
Seetha (Aamani) is a possessive wife who suspects that all the women in the world are throwing themselves at her husband Madhu (Jagapathi Babu). Things get a little interesting after Sudha (Ranjitha) enters the picture and ends up hugging Madhu right in front of Seetha's eyes. Seetha is diagnosed with a deadly heart condition and decides to have Madhu and Sudha tie the knot for the sake of a good life for her young son. She even goes as far as getting a divorce from Madhu to make him hate her. In the end, Seetha dies, Madhu and Sudha get married, and they name the baby Seetha.

Cast

 Jagapati Babu as Madhu
 Aamani as Seetha
 Ranjitha as Sudha
 Brahmanandam as Head Clerk
 Babu Mohan as Gopi
 Ali as Peon
 Tanikella Bharani as Lawyer Satyanandam
 Giri Babu as Madhu's boss
 Allu Ramalingaiah Sita's grandfather
 Sivaji Raja as Assistant lawyer
 Subbaraya Sharma as Judge
 P. J. Sarma as Doctor
 Gundu Hanumantha Rao as Departmental Store Owner
 Ironleg Sastri as Bujjulu
 Dham as Raktha Cola
 Jenny 
 Kishore Rathi
 Sri Lakshmi as Radha
 Siva Parvati as Satyanandam's wife
 Madhurima as item number
 Nirmalamma as Sita's grandmother

Soundtrack

Music composed by S. V. Krishna Reddy. Music is released on T-Series Music Company. All the songs were well received, but the track "Maataivvamma" was a huge chartbuster, soulfully rendered by Chitra, for which she won the Nandi Award for best playback singer, female.

Reception 
A critic from Andhra Today stated that "But the treatment is good and all credit is due to the director. Diwakar Babu's dialogues have helped in the movie becoming a success. The main characters do well and the songs are good".

Awards
Nandi Awards
Best Actor - Jagapati Babu
Best Supporting  Actress - Ranjitha
Best Female Playback  Singer - K. S. Chithra

References

External links
 

1996 films
1990s Telugu-language films
Indian drama films
Films directed by S. V. Krishna Reddy
Films scored by S. V. Krishna Reddy
Telugu films remade in other languages